The Wachter Motor Car Company Building, at 2600-2614 Nebraska Ave. in St. Louis, Missouri, was built in 1925.  It was listed on the National Register of Historic Places in 2007.

It is a two-story brick building built as a livery, warehouse, and funeral home.

It has also been known as the William Buol Livery and Funeral Home, and as the Sidney-Nebraska Garage Co.

References

National Register of Historic Places in St. Louis
Buildings and structures completed in 1925
Buildings and structures in St. Louis
1925 establishments in Missouri